The 2020–21 Macedonian Second Football League is the 29th season of the Macedonian Second Football League, the second division in the Macedonian football league system. The season began on 22 August 2020 and concluded on 15 May 2021.

East

Participating teams

League table

Results

Matches 1–18

Matches 19–27

Position by round

Top scorers

West

Participating teams

League table

Results

Matches 1–18

Matches 19–26

Position by round

Top scorers

See also
2020–21 Macedonian Football Cup
2020–21 Macedonian First Football League

References

External links
Football Federation of Macedonia 
MacedonianFootball.com 

North Macedonia 2
2
Macedonian Second Football League seasons